Philosophical schools of thought and philosophical movements.

A
Absurdism -
Action, philosophy of -
Actual idealism -
Actualism - 
Advaita Vedanta -
Aesthetic Realism -
Aesthetics -
African philosophy -
Afrocentrism -
Agential realism -
Agnosticism -
Agnostic theism -
American philosophy -
Anarchy -
Animism -
Antinatalism -
Antinomianism -
Anti-psychiatry—
Anti-realism -
Antireductionism -
Analytic philosophy -
Anarchism -
Ancient philosophy -
Anthropocentrism -
Anomalous monism -
Applied ethics -
Archaeology, philosophy of -
Aristotelianism -
Arithmetic, philosophy of -
Art, philosophy of -
Artificial intelligence, philosophy of -
Asceticism -
Atheism - 
Authoritarianism -
Averroism -
Avicennism -
Axiology

B
Baptism -
Behaviorism -
Bayesianism -
Bioconservatism - 
Biology, philosophy of -
Biosophy -
Buddhist philosophy - 
Business, philosophy of

C
Cartesianism -
Categorical imperative -
Charvaka -
Chinese naturalism -
Christian neoplatonism -
Capitalism -
Chance, Philosophy of -
Chinese philosophy -
Christian existentialism -
Christian humanism -
Christian philosophy -
Cognitivism -
Color, philosophy of -
Common Sense, philosophy of -
Communitarianism -
Communism -
Compatibilism and incompatibilism -
Confirmation holism -
Confucianism -
Consequentialism -
Conceptualism -
Conservatism -
Constructivist epistemology -
Continental philosophy -
Cosmopolitanism -
Critical rationalism -
Critical realism -
Critical theory-
Culture, philosophy of -
Cyberfeminism-
Cynicism -
Czech philosophy

D
Danish philosophy -
Deconstruction -
Deism -
Denialism -
Deontology -
Depressionism - 
Design, philosophy of -
Determinism -
Dialectic -
Dialectical materialism -
Dialogue, philosophy of -
Didacticism -
Digital physics -
Discordianism -
Dualistic cosmology -
Dvaita

E
Eating, philosophy of -
Ecocentrism -
Economics, philosophy of -
Ecumenism -
Education, philosophy of -
Egalitarianism -
Egocentrism -
Egoism - 
Eliminative materialism -
Emotivism -
Empiricism -
Engineering, philosophy of -
Ephesian school -
Epiphenomenalism -
Epicureanism -
Epistemological nihilism -
Epistemology - 
Esotericism -
Essentialism -
Ethics - 
Eternalism -
Eudaimonism -
Existentialism -
Externalism

F
Fallibilism -
Fascism -
Fatalism -
Feminist philosophy -
Filial piety -
Film, philosophy of -
Foundationalism -
Free will -
Fundamentalism -
Futility, philosophy of -

G
Geography, philosophy of -
German idealism -
German philosophy -
Gnosticism -
Greek philosophy -

H
Healthcare, philosophy of -
Hedonism -
Hegelianism -
Hermeticism -
Henotheism -
Heterophenomenology -
Hindu philosophy -
Historical materialism -
Historicism -
History, philosophy of -
Holism -
Hongaku -
Humanism -
Humanistic naturalism -
Hylozoism -

I
Idealism -
Identityism -
Ideological criticism -
Ignosticism -
Illegalism -
Illuminationism -
Individualism -
Indian logic -
Indian philosophy -
Indonesian philosophy -
Induction /
Inductionism -
Informal logic -
Information, philosophy of -
Innatism -
Instrumental rationality -
Instrumentalism -
Interactionism (philosophy of mind) -
Internalism and externalism -
Intuitionism -
Iranian philosophy -
Irrealism -
Islamic ethics -
Islamic philosophy

J
Japanese philosophy -
Jainism -
Jewish philosophy - 
Jingoism -
Juche -
Judeo-Islamic philosophies (800–1400) -
Just war theory

K
Kantianism -
Kabbalah -
Korean philosophy

L
Language, philosophy of -
Law, philosophy of - 
Legalism -
Leninism -
Liberalism -
Libertarianism (metaphysics) -
Libertarianism -
Linguistics, philosophy of
Logic / Informal logic -
Logical atomism -
Logical positivism -
Logicians -
Logicism -
Logic in China -
Logic in Islamic philosophy -
Logic, philosophy of -
Love, philosophy of -
Luddism

M 
Manichaeism -
Maoism -
Marxism -
Marxist philosophy of nature -
Materialism -
Mathematicism -
Maxim (philosophy) -
Mahayana Buddhism-
Mathematics, philosophy of -
Mathematics education, philosophy of -
Medical ethics -
Medieval philosophy -
Medievalism - 
Mentalism -
Mereological nihilism -
Merism -
Meta-philosophy -
Metaphysics -
Meta-ethics - Milesian school -
Mimamsa - 
Mind, philosophy of -
Mind-body dualism -
Misology -
Modernism -
Modern Islamic philosophy -
Mohism -
Monism -
Moral absolutism -
Moral realism -
Moral relativism -
Moral skepticism -
Motion, philosophy of -
Music, philosophy of -
Mysticism

N
Naïve realism -
Nature, philosophy of -
Natural Science, philosophy of -
Naturalism -
Nazism -
Negative utilitarianism - 
Neo-Confucianism -
Neoconservatism-
Neo-Hegelianism -
Neoliberalism -
Neo-Kantianism -
Neo-Luddism-
Neoplatonism -
Neopythagoreanism -
Neo-Scholasticism -
Neotaoism -
Neuroethics -
Neurophilosophy -
Neuroscience, philosophy of -
Neurotheology -
Neutral monism -
New Age -
New realism - 
New Thought -
Nihilism -
Nominalism -
Nondualism -
Non-cognitivism
Non-philosophy -
Non-theism -
Nyaya

O
Objective idealism -
Objectivism -
Occasionalism -
Ontology -
Ontotheology -
Open individualism -
Organicism

P
Paganism - 
Pakistani philosophy -
Pancritical rationalism -
Pandeism -
Panpsychism -
Pantheism -
Pataphysics -
Perception, philosophy of -
Perennial philosophy -
Perfectionism -
Peripatetic school -
Personalism -
Perspectivism -
Pessimism -
Phenomenalism -
Phenomenology -
Philosophical anthropology -
Philosophical Satanism -
 Philosophy, philosophy of -
Physicalism -
Physical ontology -
Physics, philosophy of -
Platonic realism -
Platonism -
Pluralism -
Political philosophy -
Populism -
Posadism -
Positivism -
Postanalytic philosophy -
Posthumanism -
Postpositivism -
Post-materialism -
Post-modernism -
Post-structuralism -
Practical reason -
Pragmatism -
Praxis School -
Probabilism -
Presentism -
Process philosophy -
Progressivism -
Property dualism -
Pseudophilosophy -
Psychiatry, philosophy of -
Psychological egoism -
Psychology, philosophy of -
Pure practical reason -
Pure reason -
Pyrrhonian skepticism -
Pyrrhonism -
Pythagoreanism

Q
Quantum mysticism -
Quietism

R
Raëlism -
Rastafari -
Rationalism -
Realism -
Reconstructivism -
Reductionism -
Reductive materialism -
Reformational philosophy -
Relationalism -
Relativism -
Relevance logic -
Philosophy of religion -
Philosophy of religious language -
Religious humanism -
Religious philosophy -
Reliabilism -
Renaissance humanism -
Romanian philosophy -
Romanticism -
Russian cosmism -
Russian philosophy

S
Sabellianism -
Satanism -
Sankhya -
Scotism -
Scholasticism -
 Science, philosophy of -
Scientism -
Secularism -
Secular humanism -
Self, philosophy of -
Semantic holism -
Sensualism -
Sex, philosophy of -
Sexualism -
Sexism - 
Shamanism -
Sikhism - 
Singularitarianism -
Skepticism -
Skeptical theism -
Social science, philosophy of -
Socialism -
Social philosophy -
Solipsism -
Sophism -
Space and time, philosophy of -
Spiritual philosophy -
Spiritualism -
Sport, philosophy of -
Statistics, philosophy of -
Stoicism -
Structuralism -
Subjective idealism -
Subjectivism -
Sufi metaphysics -
Śūnyatā -
Supersessionism -
Synoptic philosophy -
Systems philosophy

T
Taoism -
Teleology -
Tetralemma -
Theistic finitism -
Theism -
Thelema -
Theology -
Theosophy -
Thermal and statistical physics, philosophy of -
Thomism -
Theravada Buddhism -
Traditionalist School -
Transcendent theosophy -
Transcendental idealism -
Transcendental perspectivism -
Transcendentalism -
Transhumanism -
Transmodernism -
Type physicalism

U
Ubuntu - 
Universalism -
Utilitarian bioethics -
Utilitarianism

V
Value pluralism -
Value theory -
Vedanta - 
Verificationism - 
Verism - 
Vienna Circle -
Virtue ethics -
Vitalism - 
Voluntaryism

W

Wahdat-ul-Wujood - 
Wahdat-ul-Shuhud - 
War, philosophy of - 
Western philosophy -
Wu wei

X 
Xenofeminism

Z
Zemlyak -
Zen -
Zoroastrianism -
Zurvanism

See also
 Glossary of philosophy

Philosophies
Philosophical theories